Zapatista Coffee Cooperatives primarily operate in Chiapas, the southernmost state of Mexico following Zapatismo ideology.

The economic importance of coffee

Mexico is a significant coffee producer (7th place worldwide). Specifically, the climatic and geomorphologic conditions in Chiapas make this state the biggest coffee producer in the whole of Mexico. The production of coffee in this state is 25% of the national total.

In 1989 the protective regulations from the International Coffee Agreement were suspended. In the same period, the World Bank and the International Monetary Fund gave generous loans for the development of coffee cultivation in countries that until then were not producing (like Vietnam). As a result, there was an oversupply. The prices in the international market collapsed and, despite temporary rises, remain at low levels until today. The average price of Arabica coffee in the stock of raw materials of New York was, for the period 1976-1989, 3.30 dollars per kilo. For the period 1990-2005 it fell to 2.20 dollars per kilo. Also counting the loss of value of the dollar due to inflation, the producers saw the return from their product fall more than a half. Small producers, especially in Central America faced difficulties. Their income was not enough anymore to cover the production cost, so hundreds of thousands abandoned their lands and emigrated to nearby cities or the U.S. The fall in the price impacted the broader local economy of the region, which was significantly supported through the exports of the product.

The indigenous population of Chiapas was hit, even worse, by the crisis. They were blocked from the rest of the economical activity of Mexico, while the cultivation of coffee was their only real income. In this region, the intermediaries in 1993 were paying 8 peso (60 cents of euro) for one kilo coffee, while its resale price in Europe was more than 10 euros.  A lot of people claim that the collapse of the coffee price was the last straw for the indigenous in Chiapas. Those who didn’t abandon their plantations and their families and emigrate to the USA, joined the Zapatista army during their 1 January 1994 revolt.

The organization of Zapatista cooperatives
After the revolt, the demands of the revolted indigenous people for recognition of their culture and of their collective, economic and political rights, were not satisfied. Their struggle moved to the reconstruction of their autonomy from Mexican state.

Thousand of indigenous coffee producers with experience from their previous participation in productive cooperatives were participating, who were not concerned with only finding an economical way out for their members. As a result of their experience and the new relations that EZLN created from the start with the international solidarity movement, an idea was developed; the establishment of the first Zapatista coffee cooperative. The goal of the producers was to obtain an alternative way of supply and export of the coffee, which would allow them to end their total dependence on intermediaries and the unpredictable global market. Their call for the creation of "another" market of coffee, with more dignified conditions for the producers, was responded to quickly by small coffee shops from the U.S. with existing cooperative structures and a progressive political orientation, but also by solidarity collectives and people with no previous trading experience.

Mut-vitz cooperative
The first coffee cooperative made up exclusively of Zapatistas members was the Mut-vitz ("The Mountain of Birds") in the region San Juan de la Libertad, in the highlands of Chiapas. The Mut-vitz was established in 1997 with 200 coffee producers, which in 1999, held the first sale and export of around 35 tons to Europe and the U.S. The coffee price was set by fair trade organizations. Therefore, the producers were paid with higher prices compared to the conventional market, more than double the price that the intermediaries were giving them before this. Unfortunately, the equipment of Mut-vitz was confiscated by the government of Chiapas (citing failure to pay taxes) and the co-op disbanded in 2009.

Yachil Xojobal Chulchan cooperative
The experiment of Mut-vitz proved to be very successful. Within 3 years, the amount of coffee exported increased by five times, while the number of members significantly increased, as more and more Zapatista producers entered in the cooperative. But with a common decision, Mut-vitz chose not to accept new members until all producers complete the transitional period of 3 years, for the biological certification of coffee. This is how a new cooperative was created in Pantelhó, in the highlands, which was established in 2001 by those Zapatistas who had not been directly accepted into Mut-vitz. Its name is Yachil Xojobal Chulchan ("The new light of the sky") and its founding members were 328 producers. In 2002, it exported its first coffee container to the "solidarity market", while the next years saw a significant increase in the amount of the coffee that was produced and the number of Zapatista producers that participate in this.

Yochin Tayel Kinal and Ssit Lequil Lum cooperatives
The third Zapatista coffee cooperative, which operates in Chiapas and exports coffee through the solidarity network of supply to Europe and the U.S., is the Yochin Tayel Kinal ("Starting to work the new land"), which is based in Altamirano and comes under the Junta de Buen Gobierno, Good Government Council, of Morelia. It was established in 2002 and held its first export of coffee in 2003. This cooperative used to have 800 participants, including producers from Roberto Barios zone, who, after getting the necessary expertise, organized in 2007 autonomously, in a new forth cooperative, named Ssit Lequil Lum ("Fruits of Mother Earth"), which held its first export in the spring of 2008.

The structure of the cooperatives 
The general assembly of the producers is the supreme body of the cooperatives, which is convened at least once a year and elects a new administrative council every 3 years. In total, there are around 2.500 producers included, while the amount of coffee that goes to the solidarity networks is hundreds of tonnes, depending the special conditions each year. They are an integral part of the Zapatista movement and therefore, they cooperate with the political structures of the movement, the Good Government Councils. Respecting their decisions, which aim at the wider interests of the autonomous structures and communities.

The Zapatista coffee cooperatives are maybe the most obvious example of the development of alternative and autonomous economical structures in Chiapas. Through their operation, the producers don’t depend on the local or global market. Through the collective organization and the cooperation with the solidarity networks of disposal, the producers receive one price for their product that can cover the cost of production while also bringing them an dignified income, which increases over the years. Also, they gain access to common structures and technical support. But it is not only the producers that benefit. For as long as the cooperatives develop and improve their functions, they contribute some amount of their income to the autonomous programs of education, health, and to other social structures. Furthermore, the initiatives and the organizations that participate in the solidarity networks of disposal return some amount of their incomes for the same reasons, to the Zapatista communities. In this way, the coffee cooperatives operate as a driving force of the Zapatista movement.

Difficulties
The cooperatives faced, and continue to face, remarkable difficulties. The building of an effective organizational structure that will respect the horizontal and direct democratic political orientation of the Zapatista movement, was at first their biggest difficulty. They consciously refuse any kind of help from the Mexican state and deal with the technical and bureaucratic processes only with the support of independent and solidarity organizations in Mexico. At the same time, they try to develop some infrastructure projects such as spaces for storage and preprocessing the coffee. The biggest obstacle, currently, is the Mexican authorities, one example being a penalty, in 2007, for Mut Vitz, due to tax irregularities.

Distribution network in Europe
Nowadays, Zapatista coffee is distributed to, at least, 12 European countries from a variety of initiatives. All these local initiatives are connected through a horizontal network RedProZapa (Distribution Network of Zapatista Products), which hold central assemblies twice a year in a European city. The common characteristic that unites them is their political solidarity with the Zapatista struggle. The sale of coffee provides economical support to the productive structures in Chiapas.

See also

A Place Called Chiapas, a documentary on the Zapatistas and Subcomandante Marcos
 Chiapas conflict
Coffee production in Mexico
Himno Zapatista - anthem of the Zapatistas.
 Indigenous movements in the Americas
International Coffee Agreement
Mut-vitz
San Andrés Accords
 Union of Indigenous Communities of the Isthmus Region
Zapatista Army of National Liberation

References

Land rights movements
Separatism in Mexico
Worker cooperatives
Zapatista Army of National Liberation
Cooperatives in Mexico